Tyrus McCloud (born November 23, 1974) is a former American football linebacker. He played college football for the Louisville Cardinals. He played two seasons in the National Football League (NFL) for the Baltimore Ravens.

Tyrus attended Nova High School, where he played for Coach Willie Dodaro, as well as being on Coach Dodaro's staff at Olympic Heights High School for the 2002 and 2003 seasons.

Tyrus McCloud was the first player at the University of Louisville to bench press 500 pounds in the Howard Schnellenberger era. Submitted by former strength coach Ed Ruscher.

Louisville Cardinals football players
Baltimore Ravens players
Living people
1974 births
Nova High School alumni